Ellis (Eli) Reed (born 1946) is an American photographer and photojournalist. Reed was the first full-time black photographer employed by Magnum Agency and the author of several books, including Black In America. Several of the photographs from that project have been recognized in juried shows and exhibitions.

Reed is a former Nieman Fellow at Harvard University (1982–83) and is currently the clinical professor of photojournalism at The University of Texas at Austin. He was a runner-up for the Pulitzer Prize for Feature Photography in 1982. Reed is a Sony Global Imaging Ambassador as well as a recipient of the World Press Award and Overseas Press Club Award. Reed was honored with a Lucie Foundation Award in Documentary Photography in 2011. In 2015, Reed's work was exhibited at the prestigious Visa pour l'image Festival Du Photoreportage in Perpignan, France. In October, 2015, Reed was invited to speak at the Schomburg Center for Research in Black Culture as part of their "Visually Speaking" series. In January, 2016, Reed was a keynote speaker at National Geographic Magazine′s Photography Seminar in Washington, D.C.

Early life
Reed was raised in Perth Amboy, New Jersey. He took his first photograph at the age of 10, documenting his mother by the Christmas tree. Primarily self-taught in photography, he attributes his direction to mentor Donald Greenhaus rather than any formal studies. He studied illustration at the Newark School of Fine and Industrial Arts, graduating in 1969.

Career
Reed became a freelance photographer in 1970. Magnum Photos became affiliated with him after the success of his work in such conflicts as the wars in Central America, the war in Lebanon (which he covered between 1983 and 1987), the 1986 Haiti coup against "Baby Doc" Duvalier, and the 1989 U.S. military action in Panama. Reed became a full member of the agency in 1988. He has documented the Million Man March, Lebanon during civil war, lives of African Americans, upheaval in Zaire, U.S. military action in Panama among other things. Reed started making photographs of films and actors in 1992 and is also a member of Society of Motion Picture Still Photographers (SMPSP). Reed mainly uses the Olympus E-3, E-30, and EP-1 for his work.

Reed has taught in numerous places including at the Maine Photographic Workshop; Wilson Hicks Symposium, Miami University, Florida; Southeastern Museum of Photography, Daytona, Florida; Smithsonian Institution, Washington, D. C.; San Francisco State University; Harvard University; Boston Institute of Art; Academy of fine Art, San Francisco; University of Texas at Austin; Columbia University; Empire State College, New York; New York University, and the International Center of Photography, New York.

Awards
1992 W. Eugene Smith Grant in Documentary Photography
1992 Kodak World Image Award for Fine Art Photography
1988 World Press Photo award
1988 Leica Medal of Excellence
1983 Overseas Press Club Award
1982 Nieman Fellowship at Harvard
1981 Mark Twain Associated Press Award
1981 Pulitzer Prize, runner-up

2011 Lucie Foundation Award for Documentary Photography

Exhibitions
1973, The Black Photographer, Syracuse University
1973, New Jersey Photographs
1975, New Jersey Prisons, Newark Museum of Art
1975, The Whole Sick Crew, Newark-Rutgers University
1993, Visa pour l'image, Perpignan, France
1996, Bruce Museum, Greenwich, CT, USA
1997, Leica Gallery, New York, USA
1997, Magnum World exhibition and catalogue
1999, Black New York Photographers of the 20th Century Exhibition, Schomburg Center for Research in Black Culture
2000, Indivisible
2000, Reflections in Black, and A History of Black Photographers 1840 to the Present, Smithsonian Museum, Washington, D. C.

2014, Eli Reed Retrospective, A Long Walk Home, Leica Gallery, NYC
2014, Visa pour L'image Festival Du Photoreportage, Perpignan, France

Books
A Long Walk Home, Austin: University of Texas Press, 2015. 
Beirut: City of Regrets, New York: W. W. Norton & Company, Inc., 1988. 
Black in America New York: W. W. Norton & Company, Inc., 1997. 
Homeless in America, 1987.
 Tom Rankin, Local Heroes Changing America, New York: W. W. Norton & Company, Inc., 2000. 
 John Singleton, Poetic Justice: Film Making South Central Style. United States: Delta, 1993.

Films (Production)
1992 Getting Out, director, produced for Tokyo TV, shown at the New York Film Festival
1988 America's Children: Poorest in the Land of Plenty, photo essay for NBC.

Films (Specials/Stills)
2017 Natasha, still photographer, directed by David Bezmozgis
2014 One Hundred Years of Freedom, video and still photographer, directed by Daniel Ostroff
2005 Stay, still photographer, directed by Marc Forster
2003 2 Fast 2 Furious, still photographer, directed by John Singleton
2002 Two Weeks Notice, still photographer, directed by Marc Lawrence
2002 8 Mile, still photographer, directed by Curtis Hanson
2001 A Beautiful Mind, still photographer, directed by Ron Howard
2001 Baby Boy, still photographer, directed by John Singleton
2000 Shaft, still photographer, directed by John Singleton
1998 One True Thing, still photographer, directed by Carl Franklin
1996 Day of the Jackal, stills and specials, directed by Michael Caton-Jones
1996 Ghost of Mississippi, specials, directed by Rob Reiner
1996 Rosewood, stills, directed by John Singleton
1995 Kansas City, stills and specials, directed by Robert Altman
1994 Higher Learning, stills, directed by John Singleton
1992 Poetic Justice, stills, directed by John Singleton
1991 The Five Heartbeats, stills, directed by Robert Townsend

References

American photojournalists
Living people
African-American photographers
African-American journalists
Photography in Lebanon
1946 births
21st-century African-American people
20th-century African-American people